Land 2 Air Chronicles I: Chaos and the Darkness is an EP by American singer-songwriter Kenna.  It was released in 2011.

Track listing

Personnel 

 Kenna - Vocals, Writing, Producer
 Chad Hugo - Producer

References 

Kenna albums
2011 EPs